Galwegians Rugby Football Club is a rugby union club in Galway, Ireland. The Galwegians senior side plays in Division 2B of the All-Ireland League, the Irish domestic club competition.

Galwegians field over 16 teams including Senior, Junior (Seconds), Thirds and Women's XV, and underage sides at all levels from U20 to U7.

The Connacht Rugby squad features a number of players who played for Galwegians. The Connacht Women's representative side is constituted predominantly from Galwegians.

History
Founded in 1922, Galwegians has a long and distinguished history at the forefront of Connacht Rugby.

Jimmy Joyce was the club's first international in wartime 1943. The tradition continued into the 1950s with Dicky Roche, Brendan Guerin, Charlie Lydon, Tony O’Sullivan and Johnny Dooley each gaining caps. More recently, Eric Elwood, Gavin Duffy and John Muldoon have played regularly for Ireland.

The golden age of Galwegians rugby was the five-in-a-row Connacht League and Cup double in 1955-1960, an unprecedented feat in Irish rugby, when Wegians were arguably the best team in the country, regularly beating the other senior clubs in Ireland.

Of current Connacht "Senior Clubs" Galwegians have the record of winning the most Connacht Senior Cup with 33 wins to date, although UCG have won 34 but became a "Junior Club" in 1996.

Since 2000 Galwegians have 8 Connacht Senior Cup and 10 Connacht Senior League titles including Cup and League doubles in the 2000–01, 2001–02 then three in a row in the 2011–12, 2012–13 and 2013–14 seasons.

Galwegians Junior team broke a 34-year wait for Connacht Cup glory by beating Monivea in the final to become Heineken Connacht Junior Cup Champions in 2008, and repeated that feat in 2012 and 2014.

In 2011 the Galwegians U17 team were All Ireland U17 champions and they were runners up in 2014. In 2012, 2014 and 2016 the Galwegians Women's team were All Ireland Women's Cup winners.

Honours
Connacht Senior Cup - 17 wins
Connacht Senior League - 24 wins
Connacht Junior Cup - 8 Wins
Last Updated: 28-07-2014

Notable players

Ireland
(Player capped while playing with Galwegians RFC)

MEN
 1944 - Jimmy Joyce
 1955 - Dick Roche
 1956 - Brendan Guerin
 1956 - Charlie Lydon
 1957 - Tony O’Sullivan
 1959 - Johnny Dooley
 1997 - Eric Elwood
 1998 - Pat Duignan
 1999 - Matt Mostyn
 2007 - Gavin Duffy
 2009 - John Muldoon
 2012 - Ronan Loughney
 2016 - Niyi Adeolokun
 2017 - Bundee Aki
WOMEN

 1997 - Stephanie Dowling Folan
 1998 - Sue Ramsbottom
 2003 - Nuala Ni Chadhain
 2008 - Carol Staunton
 2012 - Ruth O'Reilly
 2014 - Sene Naoupu
 2015 - Mairead Coyne
 2015 - Mary Healy
 2016 - Nicole Fowley
 2016 - Ciara O'Connor
 2018 - Laura Feely
 2018 - Edel McMahon

Barbarians
Several Galwegians players, have represented the famous invitational side Barbarians, the most recent to play while in Galwegians colours is Niyi Adeolokun in a match against England at Twickenham Stadium won 45-63 by the Baa-Baa's.

Representatives

 1993 - Eric Elwood
 1998 - Jimmy Duffy
 1998 - Willie Ruane
 2016 - Niyi Adeolokun

British & Irish Lions
2021 to SA- Bundee Aki (6 Apps, 3 Tests)

IRFU Presidents
Galwegians surely hold the distinction of having provided more IRFU Presidents than any other club. The incumbents have been:

 1945-46 - Henry Anderson - L.D.S.I.,
 1958-59 - Johnny Glynn
 1968-69 - Chris P Crowley
 1981-82 - John Moore  - B.Sc.
 1996-97 - Bobby Deacy - F.C.A.
 2002-03 - Don Crowley - B.E.,Eur. Ing., C.Eng., M.I.E.I.
 2012-13 - William B. (Billy) Glynn

References

External links
 Official website
 Connacht Rugby - branch clubs directory

 
Irish rugby union teams
Rugby union clubs in County Galway
Senior Irish rugby clubs (Connacht)